Marie-Jeanne Musiol (born 1950) is a Swiss-Canadian photographer. She was born in Winterthur, Switzerland.

Her work is included in the collections of the National Gallery of Canada, the Museum of Fine Arts Houston, the National Museum of Women in the Arts. and the Musée national des beaux-arts du Québec.

References

20th-century Canadian women artists
21st-century Canadian women artists
1950 births
Living people
20th-century Canadian artists
21st-century Canadian artists
Canadian women photographers
Swiss women photographers
Swiss emigrants to Canada
People from Winterthur
20th-century women photographers
21st-century women photographers